Rachel Sherman may refer to:

Rachel Sherman (author) (born 1975), American author
Rachel Sherman (sociologist), American sociologist and labor historian
Rachel Sherman, daughter of American Civil War General William T. Sherman